Kostiantyn Tsymbal (born July 27, 1993) is a Ukrainian karateka competing in the kumite 84 kg division. He is 2017 and 2018 European Team Championships medalist.

References

External links
 Ukrainian Karate Federation: Kostiantyn Tsymbal

1993 births
Living people
Ukrainian male karateka